Commander Charles Ralfe "Tommy" Thompson, CMG, OBE (22 November 1894 – 11 August 1966) was a British naval officer and Prime Ministerial aide-de-camp.

Thompson was born at Penshaw, County Durham. A sailor from a young age, he worked in the submarine service of the Royal Navy during the first world war. Following armistice, he was assigned as Flag Lieutenant to Admiral Sir Arthur Waistell. When Waistell retired several years later, Thompson served as personal assistant for several successive Admirals, until finally being positioned as the first permanent Flag Lieutenant to the Lord Admiral by Sir Samuel Hoare. Thompson continued as Flag Lieutenant between the wars, and was Winston Churchill's first when he returned to the Admiralty in 1939.

Throughout Churchill's tenure as Prime Minister, Thompson remained at the Admiralty, but it is in his function as Prime Minister's Aide-de-camp that he is best remembered. During World War II, Thompson rarely was not at Churchill's side and was present during major conferences and events in London and abroad.

In 1939 he became a member of the Order of the British Empire.

Thompson retired in 1945 alongside Churchill, ending his naval career with the rank of Commander. Churchill noted Thompson on his honours list.

A lifelong bachelor, Thompson died at the age of 71 in London.

See also
Winston Churchill

External links
Biography includes photos and obituaries.

1894 births
1966 deaths
Officers of the Order of the British Empire
Royal Navy officers of World War I
Companions of the Order of St Michael and St George
Royal Navy officers of World War II
Military personnel from County Durham